Auro Alvaro da Cruz Junior (born 23 January 1996), known as Auro Jr. or just Auro, is a Brazilian professional footballer who plays as a right-back for Kazakhstan Premier League club Ordabasy.

Club career

São Paulo
Born in Jaú, São Paulo, Auro joined São Paulo FC's youth setup in 2010, aged 14. He made his first team – and Série A – debut on 7 September 2014, coming on as a first-half substitute for injured Paulo Miranda in a 2–0 home win over Sport Recife. He was handed his first start three days later, in a 4–2 success at Botafogo.

On 23 September 2014, Auro renewed his contract with the Tricolor until 2019. A regular starter under manager Muricy Ramalho, he lost his starting spot after the arrival of Bruno.

Loan Linense
In February 2016, Auro signed on loan with Linense for the 2016 Campeonato Paulista. In June, after featuring in only eight minutes for Linense, he was set to join Sport Recife on loan (including being introduced by the club as a new signing), however, he was prevented from joining the club due to a Brazilian rule that prevents a player from representing three clubs during the same year, as he had already made appearances for Linense and São Paulo in 2016. Instead, he returned to São Paulo, where he mainly featured with the under-20 squad, winning two under-20 titles that season.

Loan to América Mineiro
On 14 January 2017, Auro joined América Mineiro on loan, making a total of 16 appearances between Primeira Liga, Campeonato Mineiro, and Copa do Brasil. He started off well with América, but suffered a knee injury, requiring him to miss time due to an operation. He subsequently returned to São Paulo in 2018, after his loan spell had ended.

Toronto FC

On 13 February 2018, it was announced that Auro Jr. had been signed on loan by Major League Soccer club Toronto FC with an option to buy. He made the decision to come to Toronto after speaking to his São Paulo teammate and former Toronto FC striker Gilberto, turning down opportunities to play in South America, Portugal and Spain (including with La Liga club CD Leganés) in favour of joining Toronto. He made his club debut on 20 February 2018, in a 2–0 away win against the Colorado Rapids in the first leg of their round of 16 CONCACAF Champions League tie. He recorded his first assist on May 18, on Ryan Telfer's game-winning goal against Orlando City SC. In his debut season with the club, Auro made 28 appearances across all competitions, registering five assists.

On 17 December 2018, Toronto opted to purchase Auro Jr. permanently from São Paulo.  In 2019, he was determined to be the best right-back in the league according to Opta advanced statistics. He scored his first goal in a pre-season exhibition match on 1 April 2021, from a penalty kick, against Columbus Crew SC. At the end of the 2021 MLS season, Toronto announced they were exercising their contract option on Auro, keeping him at the club through 2022.

Loan to Santos
On 14 February 2022, Santos announced the signing of Auro on a one-year loan deal with an option to purchase. He made his debut for the club on 8 March, replacing Vinicius Balieiro at half-time in a 1–1 Copa do Brasil away draw against Fluminense-PI, with his side advancing on penalties. On 22 November 2022, Santos announced that Auro would leave the club at the end of his contract. Toronto also declined his contract option for 2023, making him a free agent.

Ordabasy
On 3 March 2023, Auro was announced at Kazakhstan Premier League club Ordabasy.

International career
At international level, Auro has represented Brazil at U-17, U-20, and U-21 level.  He earned his first callup to play in the 2013 South American U-17 Championship, playing in all nine of his team's matches, en route to a third-place finish. At the 2013 FIFA U-17 World Cup, in the quarter-finals against Mexico, he scored his team's tenth penalty kick during the shootout which they lost 11–10, after the game ended 1–1 after extra time. He was called up for the U-21 squad at the 2014 Toulon Tournament, where he was part of the championship winning team. He was called up to the U-20 team for the 2015 South American U-20 Championship, playing in three matches.

Style of play
A versatile defender, Auro is usually deployed as a right-back, but is capable of playing on either flank. Regarding Auro Jr.'s playing style, Tim Bezbatchenko – Toronto FC's senior vice-president of soccer operations and general manager – said in 2018 that he is "...a very capable two-way player and an important part of our team. Auro Jr. is an attacking threat on the wing who also puts in solid defensive work."

Career statistics

Club

Honours

Club 
São Paulo
Série A runner-up: 2014

Toronto FC
MLS Cup runner-up: 2019
Canadian Championship: 2018; runner-up: 2019
CONCACAF Champions League runner-up: 2018

International 
Brazil U-21
Toulon Tournament: 2014

References

External links

Toronto FC Official Profile 

1996 births
Living people
Footballers from São Paulo
Brazilian footballers
América Futebol Clube (MG) players
São Paulo FC players
Clube Atlético Linense players
Toronto FC players
Santos FC players
Campeonato Brasileiro Série A players
Brazil youth international footballers
2015 South American Youth Football Championship players
Major League Soccer players
Brazilian expatriate footballers
Expatriate soccer players in Canada
Association football fullbacks
Brazilian expatriate sportspeople in Canada
People from Jaú